Aldo Paúl Rocha González (born 6 November 1992) is a Mexican professional footballer who plays as a defensive midfielder for Liga MX club Atlas.

Honours
León
Liga MX: Apertura 2013, Clausura 2014

Atlas
Liga MX: Apertura 2021, Clausura 2022
Campeón de Campeones: 2022

Individual
Liga MX Best XI: Apertura 2021, Clausura 2022
Liga MX Best Defensive Midfielder: 2021–22
Liga MX All-Star: 2022

References

External links
 
 

1992 births
Living people
Mexican footballers
Liga MX players
Club León footballers
Atlético Morelia players
Sportspeople from León, Guanajuato
Association football midfielders